Siberian Yupiks, or Yuits, are a Yupik people who reside along the coast of the Chukchi Peninsula in the far northeast of the  Russian Federation and on St. Lawrence Island in Alaska. They speak Central Siberian Yupik (also known as Yuit), a Yupik language of the Eskimo–Aleut family of languages.

They are also known as Siberian or Eskimo. The name Yuit (юит, plural: юиты) was officially assigned to them in 1931, at the brief time of the campaign of support of indigenous cultures in the Soviet Union. Their self-designation is Yupighyt (йупигыт) meaning "true people".

Sirenik Eskimos also live in that area, but their extinct language, Sireniki Eskimo, shows many peculiarities among Eskimo languages and is mutually unintelligible with the neighboring Siberian Yupik languages.

Material culture

Traditional crafts 
The Siberian Yupik on St. Lawrence Island live in the villages of Savoonga and Gambell, and are widely known for their skillful carvings of walrus ivory and whale bone, as well as the baleen of bowhead whales. These even include some "moving sculptures" with complicated pulleys animating scenes such as walrus hunting or traditional dances.

Dwelling 

The winter building of Chaplino Eskimos (Ungazighmiit) was a round, dome-shaped building. It is called yaranga in the literature, the same word referring also to the similar building of the Chukchi. It was separated from the outer, cooler parts of the yaranga with haired reindeer skins and grass, supported by a cage-like framework. But the household works were done in the room of the yaranga in front of this inner building, and also many household utensils were kept there. In winter storms, and at night also the dogs were there. This room for economical purposes was called .

Other types of buildings among Chaplino Eskimos  include a modernized type, and  that was used for summer.

Spiritual culture

Shamanism 
Many Indigenous Siberian cultures had persons working as mediator (between human and beings of the belief system, among others) — usually termed as "shamans" in the literature. As Eskimo cultures were far from homogeneous (although had some similarities), thus also shamanism among Eskimo peoples had many variants.

Siberian Yupiks had shamans as well. Compared to the variants found among Eskimo groups of America, shamanism among Siberian Yupiks stressed more the importance of maintaining good relationship with sea animals. Ungazighmiit people (the largest of Siberian Yupik variants) had s, who received presents for the shamanizing, healing. This payment had a special name,  — in their language, there were many words for the different kinds of presents and payments and this was one of them. (The many kinds of presents and the words designating them were related to the culture: fests, marriage etc.; or made such fine distinctions like "thing, given to someone who has none", "thing, given, not begged for", "thing, given to someone as to anybody else", "thing, given for exchange" etc.).

Fighting the spirit of smallpox 

The Evan people, a tribe that lived on the far eastern side of Russia, believed that the spirit of smallpox could be seen as a Russian woman with red hair. A local shaman would be there to greet migrating reindeer herders (who sometimes brought the disease with them). If the shaman saw the spirit of the disease in the caravan, several shaman worked together to fight it off with a seance. Others in the tribe helped with this ritual.

Tradition says that the smallpox spirit changed from a woman to a red bull when she was attacked. The spirit of smallpox was supposed to be very powerful, and if the shaman's ritual failed, all the local people would die. The spirit would only spare two people to bury all the rest. But if the ritual worked, the spirit would be forced to leave.

Name giving 
Similarly to several other Indigenous cultures, the name-giving of a newborn baby among Siberian Yupik meant that a deceased person was affected, a certain rebirth was believed. Even before the birth of the baby, careful investigations took place: dreams, events were analyzed. After the birth, the baby's physical traits were compared to those of the deceased person. The name was important: if the baby died, it was thought that he/she has not given the "right" name. In case of sickness, it was hoped that giving additional names could result in healing.

Amulets 
Amulets could be manifested in many forms, and could protect the person wearing them or the entire family, and there were also hunting amulets. Some examples:
 a head of raven hanging on the entrance of the house, functioning as a familiar amulet;
 figures carved out of stone in shape of walrus head or dog head, worn as individual amulets;
 hunting amulets were attached to something or worn. About the effige of orca on the tools of the marine hunter, see the beliefs concerning this peculiar marine mammal below.

Concepts regarding the animal world 
The orca, wolf, raven, spider, whale, were revered animals. Also folklore (e.g. tale) examples demonstrate this. For example, a spider saves the life of a girl. The motif of spider as a benevolent personage, saving people from peril with its cobweb, lifting them up to the sky in danger, is present also in many tales of Sireniki Eskimos (as mentioned, their exact classification inside Eskimo peoples is not settled yet).

It was thought that the prey of the marine hunt could return to the sea and become a complete animal again. That is why they did not break the bones, only cut them at the joints.

Orca and wolf 
In the tales and beliefs of this people, wolf and orca are thought to be identical: orca can become a wolf or vice versa. In winter, they appear in the form of wolf, in summer, in the form of orca. Orca was believed to help people in hunting on the sea — thus the boat represented the image of this animal, and the orca's wooden representation hang also from the hunter's belt. Also small sacrifices could be given to orcas: tobacco was thrown into the sea for them, because they were thought to help the sea hunter in driving walrus. It was believed that the orca was a help of the hunters even if it was in the guise of wolf: this wolf was thought to force the reindeer to allow itself to be killed by the hunters.

Whale 
It is thought that during the hunt only those people who have been selected by the spirit of the sea could kill the whale. The hunter has to please the killed whale: it must be treated as a guest. Just like a polite host does not leave a recently arrived dear guest alone, thus similarly, the killed whale should not be left alone by the host (i.e. by the hunter who has killed it). Like a guest, it should not get hurt or feel sad. It must be entertained (e.g. by drum music, good foods). On the next whale migration (whales migrate twice a year, in spring to the north and in the autumn back), the previously killed whale is sent off back to the sea in the course of a farewell ritual. If the killed whale was pleased to (during its being a guest for a half year), then it can be hoped that it will return later, too: thus, also the future whale hunts will succeed.

Celestial concepts 
In a tale, the sky seems to be imagined arching as a vault. Celestial bodies form holes in it: beyond this vault, there is an especially light space.

See also 

 Siberian Yupik language
 Yupik languages
 Yupik
 Eskimo
 Naukan people of the Chukchi Peninsula
 Eskimo yo-yo
 Whistled language

References

Citations

Bibliography

English 

 
 Campbell, Lyle. (1997). American Indian languages: The historical linguistics of Native America. New York: Oxford University Press. .
 
 
 de Reuse, Willem J. (1994). Siberian Yupik Eskimo: The language and its contacts with Chukchi. Studies in indigenous languages of the Americas. Salt Lake City: University of Utah Press. .

Russian 

  The transliteration of author's name, and the rendering of title in English: 
  The transliteration of author's name, and the rendering of title in English: 
  The transliteration of author's name, and the rendering of title in English:

Further reading
 Krupnik, Igor, and Nikolay Vakhtin. 1997. "Indigenous Knowledge in Modern Culture: Siberian Yupik Ecological Legacy in Transition". Arctic Anthropology. 34, no. 1: 236.

External links
  Tales rendered in English; the song texts both in English and in original. Large PDF file requiring considerable computation resources.
  HTML format, the original language versions of the song texts are omitted.
  Collection of 27 texts collected by Rubtsova in 1940–1941. Translated into English and edited by Vakhtin. (The English version is the last file at the bottom of the page.) Downloadable from UAF's site licensed under Creative Commons Attribution-Noncommercial-No Derivative Works 3.0 United States License.
 
 Eskimo Language page of Endangered Languages of Indigenous Peoples of Siberia
 Ethnologue report
 The Asiatic (Siberian) Eskimos
 
 Endangered Languages in Northeast Siberia: Siberian Yupik and other Languages of Chukotka by Nikolai Vakhtin
 Krupnik, Igor and Mikhail Chlenov (2007). The end of “Eskimo land": Yupik relocation in Chukotka, 1958-1959 Études/Inuit/Studies 31 (1-2) pp 59–81.
 Smithsonian Institution, Alaska Native Collections, St. Lawrence Island Yupik
  Г.А. Меновщиков: Азиатских эскимосов язык is a summary of the Chaplino dialect. It can be read among other articles, collected under name Языки мира — Палеоазиатские языки (Languages of the world — Paleoasian languages).
  Support for Siberian Indigenous Peoples Rights (Поддержка прав коренных народов Сибири)—see the section on Eskimos
  Духовная культура (Spiritual culture), subsection of Support for Siberian Indigenous Peoples Rights (Поддержка прав коренных народов Сибири)
  A radio interview with Russian scientists about Eskimos
  ICC Chukotka, the regional office of Inuit Circumpolar Council
 

Photographs

  Rendering in English: Ungaziq settlement, Kunstkamera, Russian Academy of Sciences.
  Ungaziq is the name-giving settlement for the largest Siberian Yupik group, Ungazighmiit. Enlarged versions of the above series, select with the navigation arrows or the form.
  Rendering in English: Naukan settlement, Kunstkamera, Russian Academy of Sciences.
  Enlarged versions of the above series, select with the navigation arrows or the form.
  “Nita Tokoyu of Gambell, St. Lawrence Island, sews a gut parka with Kakhsogon (left) and Wiyi (right) standing by".
  “Yupik men wear gut parkas in this image of a St. Lawrence Island house interior, c1825".

Siberian Yupik
Yupik
Indigenous peoples in the Arctic
Alaska Native ethnic groups
Indigenous small-numbered peoples of the North, Siberia and the Far East
People from Chukotka Autonomous Okrug
Chukchi Sea